Non-printing characters or formatting marks are characters for content designing in word processors, which are not displayed at printing. It is also possible to customize their display on the monitor. The most common non-printable characters in word processors are  pilcrow,  space, non-breaking space, tab character etc.

Characters 
To display characters on the monitor screen in Microsoft Word (Home tab) or OpenOffice.org and its derivatives (upper panel), press the icon . The following symbols will be displayed:
 Space –  each pressing of the key will be displayed as 
 Non-breaking space is a space character that prevents an automatic line break at its position.
 Pilcrow.
 Line break breaks the current line without new paragraph. It puts lines of text close together.
 Tab character is used to align text horizontally to the next tab stop.
 End-of-cell and end-of row markers appear automatically in each box when display of non-printable characters turned on.
 Soft hyphen or nonbreaking hyphen is a hidden separator for hyphenation in the places specified by the user, regardless of the automatic hyphenation.
 ,  or 
.

Key combinations

See also
 Control characters

References

Typographical symbols